Varför är kärleken röd? is a compilation album by Kikki Danielsson, released in April 1983. The album reached number 29 on the Swedish Albums Chart. The album also contained a new song, the title track "Varför är kärleken röd?". In 1992, it was released to CD as Kikkis 16 bästa låtar (Swedish: for "16 best songs of Kikki").

Track listing

Side A
Varför är kärleken röd? - 3:19
Our Love is Over - 4:15
Och vi hörde klockor ringa (The Three Bells) - 4:06
Can't Get Over You - 3:35
Cowboy Yoddle Song - 2:09
Nobody's baby but mine - 3:10
Minnet (Memory) - 4:36
Queen of Hearts - 3:35

Side B
Du skriver dina kärlekssånger - 3:42
Starry Night - 4:00
Forget Me Not - 3:28
Rock 'n'Roll, du fick de bästa åren av mitt liv (Rock'n'Roll, I Gave You the Best Years of My Life) - 3:50
Good Year for the Roses - 3:07
Listen to a Country Song - 2:49
Tänker lära mig livet - 3:35
Someone Needs Somebodys Love - 3:40

Charts

References

1983 compilation albums
Kikki Danielsson compilation albums